Rio Linhas Aéreas was a Brazilian cargo airline based in Curitiba.

History 
The airline originally operated as JetSul. In 1998, however, it suspended its operations in order to restructure itself. In 2007 it started preliminary studies and tests. Cargo services started in 2008, after receiving regulatory approval. It had codeshare agreements with Globex Cargo and Smart Cargo. In 2014, the Administrative Council for Economic Defense (CADE) approved the purchase of 49.99% by Brazilian Correios, but the purchase was not concluded. Rio Linhas Aéreas had night flight contracts to transport mail and packages for Correios (Brazilian Postal Service).

Infrastructure 
In its Curitiba hub, the airline had a 12,000 sq. meters (129166 sq. ft.) warehouse, with complete infrastructure for running, managing, and controlling the airline's operations.

Fleet 

As of January 2017, Rio Linhas Aéreas no longer had any aircraft. The airline previously operated two leased Boeing 767-200 and five Boeing 727-200 freighters.

See also
List of defunct airlines of Brazil

References

External links
 Official website

Defunct airlines of Brazil
Airlines established in 2007
Airlines disestablished in 2017
2017 disestablishments in Brazil